Oaks Park, formally known as the Oakland Baseball Park, and at times nicknamed Emeryville Park, was a baseball stadium in Emeryville, California.  It was primarily used for baseball, and was the home field of the Oakland Oaks baseball team in the Pacific Coast League (PCL).  It opened in 1913, and held 11,000 people (4,000 in the grandstand and 7,000 in the two bleachers). The Oaks played there until 1955.

The ballpark was located within the city limits of Emeryville, between Oakland and Berkeley. The site was on the block bounded by 45th Street (north, first base); San Pablo Avenue (east, third base); Park Avenue (south, left field); and Watts Street (west, right field). The stadium did not front directly on San Pablo where a strip of various small commercial buildings stood, now replaced by a single one-story commercial building with several chain businesses.

Oaks Park was highly accessible, as a major streetcar line ran on San Pablo Avenue, and a station serving several of the Key System's transbay commuter rail lines existed a few blocks south at Yerba Buena Avenue.

The Oaks had been playing most of their home games (except Thursdays and Sunday mornings) at Recreation Park in San Francisco, starting when that new ballpark opened in 1907. Even after moving back to Oakland, the Oaks would play a number of games each year in San Francisco. PCL founding father J. Cal Ewing owned both the Oaks and the San Francisco Seals from 1903 until sometime in the 1920s, at which point the Oaks began playing all their games in Oakland. The short-lived San Francisco club known as the Mission Wolves also played some of their 1914 home games at Oaks Park.

The park was not well maintained in its later years, contributing to a steep decline in attendance. These factors forced the Oaks to move to Vancouver in 1956. That move proved prescient, as the New York Giants moved to San Francisco two years later, and would have likely displaced the Oaks in any event.

Until recently, the site of the park was partly an empty, fenced-off lot, with Pixar Studios overlapping it where Watts Street used to run through. In 2011, it was incorporated into the second phase of Pixar Studios' expansion. It is now a parking lot with a public bicycle path and park on the San Pablo side of the property, across the street from Oaks Card Club.

Gallery

Sources
Take Me Out to the Ball Park, Lowell Reidenbaugh, The Sporting News, 1983 & 1987, p.200

External links
Aerial view from 1931 showing Oaks Park
History of Oakland minor league ballparks
Sanborn map showing the ballpark

Baseball venues in California
Buildings and structures in Emeryville, California
Sports venues in Alameda County, California
Minor league baseball venues
Sports venues completed in 1913
1913 establishments in California
Year of disestablishment missing
Defunct baseball venues in the United States
Defunct minor league baseball venues
Sports in Oakland, California